The Tribulations of a Chinese Gentleman is a 1987 Chinese-German period film directed by Wu Yigong (Zhang Jianya is credited as a "co-director"), based on Jules Verne's novel of the same name. The film stars Chinese comic Chen Peisi, American actress Rosalind Chao, and German actor Rolf Hoppe.

External links

Shanghai Film Studio films
Films based on French novels
Films based on works by Jules Verne
Films set in China
Films shot in China
Films directed by Wu Yigong
1980s German films